Beclabuvir (also known by the research name BMS-791325; abbreviated BCV) is an antiviral drug for the treatment of hepatitis C virus (HCV) infection that has been studied in clinical trials. In February 2017, Bristol-Myers Squibb began sponsoring a post-marketing trial of beclabuvir, in combination with asunaprevir and daclatasvir, to study the combination's safety profile with regard to liver function. From February 2014 to November 2016, a phase II clinical trial was conducted on the combination of asunaprevir/daclatasvir/beclabuvir (beclabuvir is referred to as BMS-791325 in the trial) on patients infected with both HIV and HCV. Furthermore, a recent meta-analysis of six published six clinical trials showed high response rates in HCV genotype 1-infected patients treated with daclatasvir, asunaprevir, and beclabuvir irrespective of ribavirin use, prior interferon-based therapy, or restriction on noncirrhotic patients, IL28B genotype, or baseline resistance-associated variants

Pharmacology
Beclabuvir acts as a NS5B (RNA polymerase) inhibitor.

References 

NS5B (polymerase) inhibitors
Sulfamides
Experimental drugs